Julia Lönnborg (born 19 March 1993) is a Finnish handball player for Skuru IK and the Finnish national team.

References

1993 births
Living people
Finnish female handball players